Campbell Union Grammar School, now known as the Heritage Village Offices, is a historic building located in Campbell, California. The school was one of the many grammar schools that opened in Campbell and nearby cities in the 1900s. The building was completed in 1922 by prominent Bay Area architect, William H. Weeks. It is also sometimes referred to as Campbell Grammar School.

History 

Campbell Union Grammar School was completed in 1922. Four school districts combined to form the Campbell Union School District in 1920. In 1921, voters approved a bond issue that allowed Campbell Union Grammar School to become the first grammar school built by the new district. William H. Weeks designed more schools in Northern California during the period 1884-1936 than any other Bay Area-based architect. He considered Campbell Grammar School to be one of his best designs. The school has been a focal point for the community since it was built. The auditorium was built larger than necessary for the student body in order to accommodate community meetings. Between 1922 and 1946 this was the only grammar school in the Campbell Union School District.

National Register Listing 
In 1979, this building was added to the National Register of Historic Places (NRHP) - #79000544 and is listed on the Register's Historic Places in Santa Clara County. This building stands as one of few buildings examples of 1920s Greek Revival architecture in Campbell and the South Bay Area.

References

Campbell, California
Buildings and structures in Santa Clara, California
National Register of Historic Places in Santa Clara County, California
W. H. Weeks buildings